Tomé José de Barros Queirós (Thomé José de Barros Queiroz in Portuguese; 2 February 1872 in Ílhavo – 5 May 1925 in Lisbon) was a Portuguese trader, capitalist and politician of the period of the Portuguese First Republic. Among others posts, he served as member of the parliament, Minister of Finances and eventually President of the Ministry (Prime Minister). He was also a member of the Masonry.

A street in the heart of the Baixa district of Lisbon bears his name in celebration of his accomplishments.

References

1872 births
1925 deaths
People from Ílhavo
Portuguese Republican Party politicians
Nationalist Republican Party (Portugal) politicians
Prime Ministers of Portugal
Government ministers of Portugal
Finance ministers of Portugal